Dame Angela Rosemary Emily Strank  (born October 1952) is head of downstream technology and chief scientist of BP, responsible for technology across all the refining, petrochemicals, lubricants and fuels businesses.

Education
Strank was educated at the University of Manchester where she received a Bachelor of Science degree in geology in 1975 followed by a PhD in micropalaeontology in 1981. Her doctoral research investigated the foraminiferal stratigraphy of the Holkerian, Asbian and Brigantian stages of the British lower carboniferous and was supervised by Fred M. Broadhurst.

Career
In 1980, Strank joined the British Geological Survey by what she says was becoming a geologist "by accident".
 In 1982, she joined BP as a geologist. In 2013, she joined the University of Manchester's board of governors. In April 2014, she was appointed chief scientist. She also serves as a non-executive director at Severn Trent Water plc.

Honours and awards
In 2010, she won the UK First Women's Award in Science and Technology, an award sponsored by the UK Government (CBI) in recognition of pioneering UK women in business and industry.

In the 2017 Birthday Honours, Strank was appointed Dame Commander of the Most Excellent Order of the British Empire (DBE). In the same year she was elected a Fellow of the Royal Academy of Engineering (FREng). She was elected a Fellow of the Royal Society (FRS) in 2018 for substantial contributions to the improvement of natural knowledge. She was awarded an honorary Doctor of Science (DSc) by Royal Holloway, University of London in 2018.

Coat of Arms 
By Letters Patent of Garter and Clarenceux Kings of Arms dated 1 July 2019, from the College of Arms, Strank was granted arms:

Personal life
Strank has two children.

References

1952 births
Living people
21st-century women engineers
Alumni of the University of Manchester
BP people
Dames Commander of the Order of the British Empire
Fellows of the Royal Academy of Engineering
Fellows of the Royal Society
Female Fellows of the Royal Academy of Engineering
Female Fellows of the Royal Society
Place of birth missing (living people)